The 1920 Nevada Sagebrushers football team was an American football team that represented the University of Nevada as an independent during the 1920 college football season. In their second season under head coach Ray Courtright, the team compiled a 7–3–1 record and outscored opponents by a total of 186 to 167.

Schedule

References

Nevada
Nevada Wolf Pack football seasons
Nevada Sagebrushers football